The women's team compound competition at the 2021 World Archery Championships took place from 21 to 24 September in Yankton, United States.

Schedule
All times are Central Daylight Time (UTC−05:00).

Qualification round
Results after 216 arrows.

Elimination round

Source:

References

2021 World Archery Championships